Willeke Arkema-Knol (née Knol; born 10 April 1991) is a Dutch former racing cyclist. She competed in the 2013 UCI women's team time trial in Florence. In 2015, Knol finished sixth in the Acht van Westerveld.

See also
2013 Team Argos–Shimano season
2014 Team Giant–Shimano season
2015 Team Liv–Plantur season

References

External links

1991 births
Living people
Dutch female cyclists
People from Zwartewaterland
Cyclists from Overijssel
21st-century Dutch women